William Cowper  (1701 – 12 October 1767) was a British doctor and antiquarian.

Life
Cowper was the third son of the Reverend John Cowper, MA of Overleigh Hall, Cheshire, by Catherine, daughter of William Sherwin, beadle of divinity and bailiff of the University of Oxford. He was baptised at St Peter's Church, Chester, on 29July 1701, was admitted a student at Leiden University on 27October 1719, and probably took his doctor's degree in that university. For many years he practised as a physician at Chester with great reputation. In 1745 he was elected mayor of Chester.

He was elected a fellow of the Society of Antiquaries of London. He published anonymously A Summary of the Life of St. Werburgh, with an historical account of the images upon her shrine (now the episcopal throne) in the choir of Chester. Collected from antient chronicles and old writers, by a Citizen of Chester, Chester, 1749. This work is said to have been stolen from the manuscripts of Mr. Stone. He was also the author of Il Penseroso: an evening's contemplation in St. John's churchyard, Chester. A rhapsody, written more than twenty years ago, and now (first) published, illustrated with notes historical and explanatory, London, 1767, addressed, under the name of M. Meanwell, to the Rev. John Allen, M.A., senior fellow of Trinity College, Cambridge, and rector of Tarporley, Cheshire. In this work Cowper takes a view of some of the most remarkable places around Chester distinguished by memorable personages and events. He was an intelligent antiquarian and preserved many valuable manuscript collections of Williamson and others which would otherwise have perished. He also left several works of his own compilation relative to the ancient history of Cheshire and Chester. These manuscripts, which are frequently quoted by George Ormerod, the Cheshire historian, are preserved in the family archives at Overleigh. They consist of various small volumes, most of the contents of which are fairly transcribed into two larger ones, containing memoirs of the earls of the palatinate and the bishops and dignitaries of the cathedral, lists of city and county officers, and a local chronology of events. In his Broxton MSS he takes William Webbe's Itinerary as the text of each township, adds an account of it transcribed from Edward Williamson's Villare Cestriense, and continues the descent of property to his own time. He also wrote a small manuscript volume, entitled Parentalia, containing memoirs of the Cowper family, and the account of the siege of Chester, which is printed in Ormerod's Cheshire, vol. 1, pp. 203 etc. This description of the siege had been printed twice previously at Chester (in 1790 and 1793), but with considerable alterations.

Cowper was a guardian of the Foundling Hospital in London.

Overleigh Hall
The Hall, to the west of what is now the modern district of Handbridge, was built by Thomas Cowper (d. 1695), who had acquired the estate partly through descent and partly through purchase. William Cowper made improvements to the property, which in 1811 was inherited by Charles Cholmondeley of Vale Royal Abbey and rented to a tenant.

Personal life and death
Cowper married Elizabeth, daughter of John Lonsdale of High Ryley, Lancashire, in 1722, but had no issue. He died at Overleigh on 12October 1767, and was buried at St. Peter's Church, Chester.

References

Attribution:
 

1701 births
1767 deaths
Fellows of the Society of Antiquaries of London